PGU ȘS4-FC Alga Tiraspol is a women's football club from Tiraspol, Moldova. It plays in the country's top level league.

Titles
 Moldovan Women's Cup
 Winners (3): 2009–10, 2012–13, 2014–15

References

External links
Official Website

Women's football clubs in Moldova
Football clubs in Moldova
Football clubs in Transnistria